Gelovani may mean:

Gelovani, a Georgian noble family
Archil Gelovani (1915–1978), Soviet Georgian military commander
Mikheil Gelovani (1893–1956), Soviet Georgian actor
Mirza Gelovani (1917–1944), Georgian poet
Sopho Gelovani (b. 1984), Georgian singer 
Varlam Gelovani (1878–1915), Georgian politician